R v Hebert [1990] 2 S.C.R. 151 is the leading Supreme Court of Canada decision on an accused's right to silence under section seven of the Canadian Charter of Rights and Freedoms.

Background
In 1987, Neil Hebert was arrested for armed robbery. He was informed of his rights and taken to an RCMP detachment. Upon consulting a lawyer, he said he was not going to make any statements. Hebert was put in a cell with an undercover agent posing as another arrested suspect. The undercover agent chatted with Hebert and managed to elicit several incriminating statements from him.

At trial, a voir dire was held to determine the admissibility of the conversation. The judge found that Hebert's right to counsel under section 10(b) of the Charter, and his right to remain silent under section 7 were violated. On appeal the court found that Hebert's rights were not violated and a new trial was ordered.

Opinion of the Court
Beverley McLachlin, writing for the majority, held that the evidence was inadmissible and upheld the trial judge's ruling.

McLachlin found that the right to silence was a principle of fundamental justice and as such was protected under section 7. Once in police custody, an accused's right cannot be undermined through acts of police trickery. However, if the accused were to divulge information to an informer or undercover agent of their own free will then the statements could be used against them.

External links

Section Seven Charter case law
Supreme Court of Canada cases
1990 in Canadian case law
Canadian criminal procedure case law
Canadian evidence case law